Preben Maegaard (September 25, 1935 – March 25, 2021), was a Danish renewable energy pioneer, author and expert. Since the oil crisis in 1974 he worked for the transition from fossil fuels to renewable energy.
Preben Maegaard was co-founder of the Nordic Folkecenter for Renewable Energy, established in 1983, and its director 1984 till 2013 (www.folkecenter.net).

Work 

Preben Maegaard works locally, nationally and internationally at the organisational, political and technological levels within broad spectrum of renewable energy technologies. 
From 1979 to 1984 Preben Maegaard was chairman of the Danish Renewable Energy Association (OVE), since 1991, vice-president of Eurosolar (the European Renewable Energy Association) and in 2006, appointed senior vice-president. Since 1992 he has been co-ordinator of the European Solar Prize in Denmark and member of the European Solar Prize Jury. In 1995 he became Member of Senate, UTER, Technical University, Havana. In 1996 and the following years, Preben Maegaard was member of the board of EUROSUN, an intergroup set up by the European Parliament. Since 1999, he has been a board member of the European Renewable Energies Federation (EREF)  and Renewable Energy Adviser to the President of Mali, Alpha Konare, leading to the establishment of the Mali Folkecenter. In 2001, he became a chairperson of the Committee of the World Council for Renewable Energy (WCRE). When the World Wind Energy Association (WWEA) was founded in 2001, he became its first president, a position he held till 2005. In May 2006, the World Wind Energy Institute (WWEI)  was initiated in Kingston, Canada, involving seven institutes from China, Brazil, Cuba, Canada, Russia, Egypt and Denmark. Preben Maegaard was appointed the first president of the WWEI. He was co-founder of the SolarSuperState Association  when it was founded in 2012 and became its first president.

As the director of the Folkecenter he has been responsible for the technological innovation of windmills, including design, construction and implementation of sizes from 20 to 525 kW, farm biogas digesters from 50 to 1000 m3 as well as integrated energy systems including hydrogen and biofuels for transport. The technological development and implementation activities took place in cooperation with DS Trade and Industry (www.ds-net.dk). The Folkecenter has under his leadership provided transfer of renewable energy technology to many countries, and set up numerous pilot projects worldwide. In 2002, the liberal government suspended the national renewable energy development and implementation activities and programs in which Preben Maegaard held positions. Danish State support to the Folkecenter received since 1983 was suspended as well. Since 2005, Folkecenter has received funding from the Energifonden and since 2012 support from the Danish state.

Preben Maegaard has served on several Danish national governmental committees and councils for the development and implementation of renewable energy as member of: 
 Renewable Energy Steering Group (1981-1991); 
 National Board of Technology;  National Renewable Energy Council in Denmark (1991-1996); 
 National Committee Biomass for Energy (1985-1989); 
 National Committee for Solar Energy (1995-2002); 
 National Committee for Wave Power (1997-2002); 
 National Committee for Hydrogen from Renewable for Transport Purposes (1998-2002).

For over three decades, Preben Maegaard has been conference director, organiser, speaker and/or participant of numerous national and international seminars, workshops and conferences, chairman of the World Wind Energy Conferences: WWEC2003 in Cape Town, WWEC2004 in Beijing and WWEC2005 in Melbourne (www.wwindea.org). Preben Maegaard is author and/or co-author of numerous reports, books, articles and periodicals in Danish, English, German and Japanese within the field of renewable energy and sustainable development and has received a number of awards. In March 2010 Preben Maegaard was featured in documentary film The Fourth Revolution: Energy.

Professional career
Education
 1957 - 1962: Economist, graduated in Microeconomics, Human Resources and International Trade. Copenhagen School of Business and Economics. 
Studies, Law and Ethnography, Copenhagen University.
 1962 - 1965: Economist, Statistical  Planning Bureau, Ministry of Housing

Early Career
 1965 - 1970: Lecturer, Adult Education, Social Sciences and Human Ecology, Open University Courses and Danish Folk High Schools
 1970 - 1975: Manager, NORDENFJORD College of Innovative Productions and Human Development
 1975 - 1983: Consultant and Project Implementation Manager for Small and Medium Size Enterprises, Renewable Energy.

Project management | Organisation: Dansk Smedemesterforening (DS Trade & Industry)
 1976 - 1982: Cooperation about development of construction manuals. 11, 22, 55 kW wind turbines for the Danish market. Marketing strategies. Association of 2000 members, 20 companies directly involved. Coordination, testing and approval.
 1980 - 1982: Coordination of project group design engineering and product implementation. 100 kW wind turbine (Rudbjerg). Supported by Danish Agency of Industry.
 1981 - 1985: Farm biogas, 50, 100, 200 cubic meter. Cooperation about development of construction manuals. Marketing strategies. Four companies directly involved. Coordination, testing and approval. Supported by Danish Agency of Industry

Founder and director | Organisation: Nordic Folkecenter for Renewable Energy
 1984 - 1992: Development of construction manual. Wind turbine, 150, 200, 275 and 525 kW. Corporation development of manufacturing incl. subcontractors.
 1987 - 1988: Large-scale solar collector for direct heating. Supported by Danish Agency of Industry.
 1987 - 1989: Local island production and usage. Prototype development. Wind turbine project Bornholm, Denmark, 9 x 99 kW. Local production within the Baltic Power organization.
 1988 - 1995: Concept development, technology research, project development, coordination and advising of Danish local cogeneration scheme. The target group was local consumer owned district heating associations. Appx. 200 installations with a grand total of 2.700 MW by 1995.
 1990 - 1992: Organization of local production of wind power in Poland. Local production organization, building and testing. 95 kW. Supported by Danish Agency of Industry
 1991 - 1994: Technology transfer of Hydrogen-electrolyze system from Ukraine to Denmark.
 1992: Solar technology, Hungary. Technology transfer. Partly local production. Training of local staff.
 1992 - 1993: University of Pernambuco, Recife, Brazil. Transfer and installation of FC type 75 kW wind turbine for island wind-diesel operation. Supported by Danish Agency of Industry
 1996 - 1997: 600 kW wind turbine project in Kaliningrad. Supported by Danish Environmental Protection Agency.
 1997- 1999: 10 kW wind turbine tech to Bayamo, Cuba, Technical University in Havana. Technology transfer, erection and testing. Local production.
 1998: Home power, Transylvania, Rumania, 3 kW wind turbine and solar cell system. Remote area, stand alone system. Supported by European Commission.
 1998: Biogas plant, Kaunas, Lithuania, Development, production, installation and commissioning using local producers. Supported by Danish Environmental Protection Agency.
 1998 - 2002: Advisor to the President of Mali, Alpha Konaré. Implementation of village electrification in the Sikasso region. Building and operation of RE training center in Tabaccoro, Mali. Supported by Danida
 1990 - 1995: Information and marketing of renewable energy and technology transfer of Danish know-how. Mobile exhibition campaigns and information to eight East European countries. Committee member in Danish board technology.
 2001: Biogas plant, Yubetsu, Japan, Development, production in Denmark. Installation and commissioning using local assistance. Coordination for Kawasaki Engineering.

Awards
1978, Solar Prize, Danish Organisation for Renewable Energy (OVE)
1985, Plum Environmental Prize, Plum Fonden
1987, Environmental Prize, Association of Danish Engineers
1992, Wind Energy Prize, Denmark's Windmill Owners Association
1997, European Solar Prize, EUROSOLAR
2002, The GAIA Prize, Gaia Trust
2002, MERKUR Pioneer Prize, MERKUR cooperative Bank
2005, Nuclear-Free Future Award
2008, World Wind Energy Award, World Wind Energy Association
2010, CommunityPower Award, Toronto, Canada

Recent publications
 Beuse, E.; Boldt, J.; Maegaard, P.; Meyer, N.I.; Windeleff, J.; Ostergaard, I. (2000) Vedvarende energi i Danmark. En krønike om 25 opvækstår 1975 – 2000, OVE's Forlag; Aarhus
 Maegaard, P.; Kruse, J. (2001) Energien fra Thy. Fra de lokale til det globale, Nordvestjysk Folkecenter for Vedvarende Energi; Hurup Thy
 Maegaard, P. (2003) Wind Energy for the Future, Keynote paper prepared for the 13th Islamic Academy of Science, IAS, Conference; Kuching, Malaysia
 El Bassam, N.; Maegaard, P. (2004) Integrated Renewable Energy for Rural Communities, ELSEVIER; Amsterdam and London. 
 Maegaard, P. (2004) Die Kraft der Sonne in den Dienst der Menschheit stellen. In Hermann Scheer. Praktische Visionen, Ponte Press; Bochum
 Maegaard, P. (2004) Laudatio for Dr. Hermann Scheer, The WORLD WIND ENERGY AWARD, WWEC2004; Beijing
 E Thybo Andersen, Finn; Maegaard, Preben: (2006) Byvandringer 1968 ¤ Bykulturen ved vejs ende, YNKB TEMA 12; København, ISSN 1602-2815
 Maegaard, P.,  (2010) "Wind Energy Development and Application Prospects, of Non-Grid-Connected Wind Power," in: Proceedings of 2009 World Non-Grid-Connected Wind,  Power and Energy Conference. IEEE Press.
 Maegaard, P.:  (2012)  "Integrated Systems to Reduce Global Warming" in "Handbook of Climate Mitigation", Vol IV, Springer Science, New York, 
 El Bassam, N., Maegaard, P., Schlichting, M.L., (2013) "Distributed Renewable Energies for Off-Grid Communities," Elsevier Science, New York
 Maegaard, P., Palz, W., Krenz, A.:  (2013) "Wind Power for the World, The Rise of Modern Wind Energy",  Vol 2, Part I, Pan Stanford, Singapore
 Maegaard, P., Palz, W., Krenz, A.:  (2013) "Wind Power for the World, International Reviews and Developments",  Vol 2, Part II, Pan Stanford, Singapore

References

1935 births
Living people
Danish environmentalists
Energy engineers